September is the debut studio album by Swedish singer and songwriter Petra Marklund, then performing as September. It was released on 11 February 2004 as the first and only album released by September on Stockholm Records. The album entered the Swedish Album Chart at its peak position of #36 and remained on the chart for a total of six consecutive weeks.

Track listing
All tracks written by Jonas von der Burg, Anoo Bhagavan and Niclas von der Burg, except "We Can Do It" written by Sigidi, Harold Clayton, J. von der Burg, Bhagavan and N. von der Burg.

Charts
The album debuted at #36 on the Swedish Album Chart on 20 February 2004. It totalled six weeks in the nation's top 60, continuing falling after its #36 peak.

References

2004 debut albums
Petra Marklund albums